Snowflake is a town in Navajo County, Arizona, United States. It was founded in 1878 by Erastus Snow and William Jordan Flake, Mormon pioneers It has frequently been noted on lists of unusual place names. According to 2010 Census, the population of the town is 5,590.

The Apache Railway provides freight service.

Geography
Snowflake is located at  (34.5223005, -110.0913752).

Demographics

As of the census of 2000, there were 4,460 people, 1,312 households, and 1,070 families residing in the town. The racial makeup of the town was 87.2% White, 0.3% Black or African American, 6.9% Native American, 0.5% Asian, 0.1% Pacific Islander, 3.0% from other races, and 2.0% from two or more races. 8.1% of the population were Hispanic or Latino of any race.

There were 1,312 households, out of which 46.5% had children under the age of 18 living with them, 69.5% were married couples living together, 9.1% had a female householder with no husband present, and 18.4% were non-families. 15.8% of all households were made up of individuals, and 6.7% had someone living alone who was 65 years of age or older. The average household size was 3.37 and the average family size was 3.81.

In the town, the population was spread out, with 37.9% under the age of 18, 9.8% from 18 to 24, 21.8% from 25 to 44, 19.8% from 45 to 64, and 10.7% who were 65 years of age or older. The median age was 28 years. For every 100 females, there were 99.7 males. For every 100 females age 18 and over, there were 95.3 males.

The median income for a household in the town was $37,439, and the median income for a family was $42,500. Males had a median income of $30,517 versus $21,164 for females. The per capita income for the town was $13,391. About 10.4% of families and 15.0% of the population were below the poverty line, including 18.7% of those under age 18 and 14.1% of those age 65 or over.

Recently, the town and surrounding area have experienced steady growth, primarily to the east, west and south. An additional 9-holes were added to the 18-hole golf course.

The remoteness of Snowflake and the low level of pollution attracts many individuals suffering from multiple chemical sensitivity syndrome (MCS) to the town. As of July 2016 there were approximately 20 households who report to be suffering from MCS.

Education
Snowflake is a part of the Snowflake Unified School District, consisting of Highland Primary School, Snowflake Intermediate School, Snowflake Junior High and Snowflake High School. Taylor Elementary School in the neighboring town of Taylor, Arizona, is also part of the Snowflake Unified school District.

Northland Pioneer College's Silver Creek campus extension is located in Snowflake.

Climate
Snowflake experiences a four-season climate with a warm (sometimes hot) summer, mild autumn, mild to cold winter and cool, windy spring. Typical high temperatures hover around 90 °F (32 °C) during July and August and 30 (-1 °C) to 49 °F (13 °C) in December/January.

In popular culture 
 Some members of the logging crew involved in the Travis Walton abduction incident live in this town, and several events surrounding that incident happened here. These events were dramatized in the sci-fi film Fire in the Sky (1993).

Notable people 
 Walter Blackman, Republican member of the Arizona House of Representatives
 Jeff Flake, current United States Ambassador to Turkey, former United States Senator
 Marilyn Jarrett (1939–2006), Arizona businesswoman and politician, was born in Snowflake.
 Buzz Miller (1923–1999), dancer, was born in Snowflake.
 Jesse N. Smith (1834–1906), Mormon pioneer, church leader, politician and colonizer of Snowflake. The Jesse N. Smith House in Snowflake is listed on the National Register of Historic Places.
 Travis Walton, who was allegedly abducted by space aliens, is an author and was played by D. B. Sweeney in the sci-fi film Fire in the Sky (1993), lives in Snowflake.

See also 
 List of historic properties in Snowflake, Arizona

References

External links 

 Town website
 History of Snowflake, AZ

1878 establishments in Arizona Territory
Populated places established in 1878
Towns in Navajo County, Arizona
White Mountains (Arizona)